Paul-Heinrich Lange (born 12 October 1908, date of death unknown) was a German sailor who competed in the 1952 Summer Olympics.

References

1908 births
Year of death missing
German male sailors (sport)
Olympic sailors of Germany
Sailors at the 1952 Summer Olympics – 6 Metre